The 5th Critics' Choice Documentary Awards were presented on November 16, 2020 honoring the finest achievements in documentary filmmaking and non-fiction television; due to the COVID-19 pandemic the ceremony was held via online. The nominees were announced in October 26, 2020 with Crip Camp: A Disability Revolution, Gunda and Mr. Soul! leading the nominations with five.

Winners and nominees

Films by multiple nominations and wins

The following films received multiple nominations:

The following films received multiple awards:

See also
93rd Academy Awards

References

Critics’ Choice Documentary Awards
Critics' Choice Documentary Awards